Andrew Akindele (born January 11, 2000) is an American soccer player who plays as a forward for South Georgia Tormenta in the USL League One.

Career

Youth and college
Akindele attended Jones College Prep High School and played in the USSDA from 2011 through 2018 with the Chicago Fire Academy.

in 2018, Akindele attended the University of Wisconsin–Madison to play college soccer. In four seasons with the Badgers, Akindele made 56 appearances, scoring ten goals and tallying eight assists. In 2018, he earned All-Big Ten freshman team honors.

Whilst at college, Akindele also appeared in the USL League Two, making eight appearances for Chicago FC United in their 2021 season.

Professional
Ahead of the inaugural MLS Next Pro season, Akindele signed with FC Cincinnati 2 on March 11, 2022. He scored three goals in 15 appearances for Cincinnati.

On March 15, 2023, Akindele signed with USL League One side South Georgia Tormenta. He made his debut for Tormenta on March 17, 2023, starting in a 1–0 win over North Carolina FC.

References

External links 
 

2000 births
Living people
American soccer players
Association football forwards
FC Cincinnati 2 players
Chicago FC United players
MLS Next Pro players
Soccer players from Illinois
Sportspeople from Chicago
Tormenta FC players
USL League One players
USL League Two players
Wisconsin Badgers men's soccer players